An election was held on November 4, 2014, to elect all 120 members to North Carolina's House of Representatives. The election coincided with elections for other offices, including U.S. Senate, U.S. House of Representatives, and state senate. The primary election was held on May 6, 2014.

Results Summary

Incumbents defeated in primary election
Robert Brawley (R-District 95), defeated by John Fraley (R)

Incumbents defeated in general election
Tom Murry (R-District 41), defeated by Gale Adcock (D)
Mike Stone (R-District 51), defeated by Brad Salmon (D)
Nathan Ramsey (R-District 115), defeated by John Ager (D)
Tim Moffitt (R-District 116), defeated by Brian Turner (D)

Open seats that changed parties
Winkie Wilkins (D-District 2) didn't seek re-election, seat won by Larry Yarborough (R)

Detailed Results

Districts 1-19

District 1 
Incumbent Republican Bob Steinburg has represented the 1st District since 2013.

District 2 
Incumbent Democrat Winkie Wilkins has represented the 2nd district and its predecessors since 2005. Winkins didn't seek re-election and was succeeded by Republican Larry Yarborough.

District 3 
Incumbent Republican Michael Speciale has represented the 3rd district since 2013.

District 4 
Incumbent Republican Jimmy Dixon has represented the 4th district since 2011.

District 5 
Incumbent Democrat Annie Mobley has represented the 5th district since 2007. Mobley lost re-nomination to fellow Democrat Howard Hunter III.

District 6 
Incumbent Democrat Paul Tine has represented the 6th district since 2013.

District 7 
Incumbent Democrat Bobbie Richardson has represented the 7th district since 2013.

District 8 
Incumbent Republican Susan Martin has represented the 8th district since 2013.

District 9 
Incumbent Republican Brian Brown has represented the 9th district since 2013.

District 10 
Incumbent Republican John Bell has represented the 10th district since 2013.

District 11 
Incumbent Democrat Duane Hall has represented the 11th district since 2013.

District 12 
Incumbent Democrat George Graham has represented the 12th district since 2013.

District 13 
Incumbent Republican Pat McElraft has represented the 13th district since 2007.

District 14 
Incumbent Republican George Cleveland has represented the 14th district since 2005.

District 15 
Incumbent Republican Phil Shepard has represented the 15th district since 2011.

District 16 
Incumbent Republican Chris Millis has represented the 16th district since 2013.

District 17 
Incumbent Republican Frank Iler has represented the 17th district since 2009.

District 18 
Incumbent Democrat Susi Hamilton has represented the 18th district since 2011.

District 19 
Incumbent Republican Ted Davis Jr. has represented the 19th district since 2012.

Districts 20-39

District 20 
Incumbent Republican Rick Catlin has represented the 20th district since 2013.

District 21 
Incumbent Democrat Larry Bell has represented the 21st district since 2001.

District 22 
Incumbent Democrat William Brisson has represented the 22nd district since 2007.

District 23 
Incumbent Democrat Joe Tolson has represented the 23rd district and its predecessors since 1997. Tolson didn't seek re-election and was succeeded by DemocratShelly Willingham.

District 24 
Incumbent Democrat Jean Farmer-Butterfield has represented the 24th district since 2003.

District 25 
Incumbent Republican Jeff Collins has represented the 25th district since 2011.

District 26 
Incumbent Republican Leo Daughtry has represented the 26th district and its predecessors since 1993.

District 27 
Incumbent Democrat Michael Wray has represented the 27th district since 2005.

District 28 
Incumbent Republican James Langdon Jr. has represented the 28th district since 2005.

District 29 
Incumbent Democratic Minority Leader Larry Hall has represented the 29th district since 2006.

District 30 
Incumbent Democrat Paul Luebke has represented the 30th district and its predecessors since 1991.

District 31 
Incumbent Democrat Mickey Michaux has represented the 31st district and its predecessors since 1983.

District 32 
Incumbent Democrat Nathan Baskerville has represented the 32nd district since 2013.

District 33 
Incumbent Democrat Rosa Gill has represented the 33rd district since 2009.

District 34 
Incumbent Democrat Grier Martin has represented the 34th district since 2013.

District 35 
Incumbent Democrat Chris Malone has represented the 35th district since 2013.

District 36 
Incumbent Republican Nelson Dollar has represented the 36th district since 2005.

District 37 
Incumbent Republican Paul Stam has represented the 37th district since 2003.

District 38 
Incumbent Democrat Yvonne Lewis Holley has represented the 38th district since 2013.

District 39 
Incumbent Democrat Darren Jackson has represented the 39th district since 2009.

Districts 40-59

District 40 
Incumbent Republican Marilyn Avila has represented the 40th district since 2007.

District 41 
Incumbent Republican Tom Murry has represented the 41st district since 2011. Murry was defeated for re-election by Democrat Gale Adcock

District 42 
Incumbent Democrat Marvin Lucas has represented the 42nd district since 2001.

District 43 
Incumbent Democrat Elmer Floyd has represented the 43rd district since 2009.

District 44 
Incumbent Democrat Rick Glazier has represented the 44th district since 2003.

District 45 
Incumbent Republican John Szoka has represented the 45th district since 2013.

District 46 
Incumbent Democrat Ken Waddell has represented the 46th district since 2013.

District 47 
Incumbent Democrat Charles Graham has represented the 47th district since 2011.

District 48 
Incumbent Democrat Garland Pierce has represented the 48th district since 2005.

District 49 
Incumbent Republican Gary Pendleton has represented the 49th district since his appointment on August 19, 2014.  Pendleton is seeking his first full term.

District 50 
Incumbent Democrat Graig Meyer has represented the 50th district since his appointment in October 2013. Meyer was elected to his first full term.

District 51 
Incumbent Republican Mike Stone has represented the 51st district since 2011. Stone lost re-election to Democrat Brad Salmon.

District 52 
Incumbent Republican Jamie Boles has represented the 52nd district since 2009.

District 53 
Incumbent Republican David Lewis has represented the 53rd district since 2003.

District 54 
Incumbent Democrat Robert Reives II has represented the 54th district since 2014.

District 55 
Incumbent Republican Mark Brody has represented the 55th district since 2014.

District 56 
Incumbent Democrat Verla Insko has represented the 56th district since 1997.

District 57 
Incumbent Democrat Pricey Harrison has represented the 57th district since 2005.

District 58 
Incumbent Democrat Alma Adams has represented the 58th district and its predecessors since 1994. Adams ran for the U.S House. Democrat Ralph Johnson won the open seat.

District 59 
Incumbent Republican Jon Hardister has represented the 59th district since 2013.

Districts 60-79

District 60 
Incumbent Democrat Marcus Brandon has represented the 60th district since 2011. Brandon ran for the U.S House and fellow Democrat Cecil Brockman was elected to succeed him.

District 61 
Incumbent Republican John Faircloth has represented the 61st District since 2011.

District 62 
Incumbent Republican John Blust has represented the 62nd District since 2001.

District 63 
Incumbent Republican Stephen Ross has represented the 63rd District since 2013.

District 64 
Incumbent Republican Dennis Riddell has represented the 64th District since 2013.

District 65 
Incumbent Republican Bert Jones has represented the 65th District since 2011.

District 66 
Incumbent Democrat Ken Goodman has represented the 66th District since 2011.

District 67 
Incumbent Republican Justin Burr has represented the 67th District since 2009.

District 68 
Incumbent Republican Craig Horn has represented the 68th District since 2011.

District 69 
Incumbent Republican Dean Arp has represented the 69th District since 2013.

District 70 
Incumbent Republican Pat Hurley has represented the 70th District since 2007.

District 71 
Incumbent Democrat Evelyn Terry has represented the 71st District since 2013.

District 72 
Incumbent Democrat Ed Hanes has represented the 72nd District since 2013.

District 73 
Incumbent Republican Mark Hollo has represented the 73rd District and its predecessors since 2011. Hollo didn't seek re-election and Republican Lee Zachary won the open seat.

District 74 
Incumbent Republican Debra Conrad has represented the 74th District since 2013.

District 75 
Incumbent Republican Donny Lambeth has represented the 75th District since 2013.

District 76 
Incumbent Republican Carl Ford has represented the 76th District since 2013.

District 77 
Incumbent Republican Harry Warren has represented the 77th District since 2011.

District 78 
Incumbent Republican Allen McNeill has represented the 78th District since 2012.

District 79 
Incumbent Republican Julia Craven Howard has represented the 79th District and its predecessors since 1989.

Districts 80-99

District 80 
Incumbent Republican Roger Younts has represented the 80th District since his appointment July 2013. Younts lost re-nomination to fellow Republican Sam Watford. Watford won the general election.

District 81 
Incumbent Republican Rayne Brown has represented the 81st District since 2011.

District 82 
Incumbent Republican Larry Pittman has represented the 82nd District since 2011.

District 83 
Incumbent Republican Linda Johnson has represented the 83rd District and its predecessors since 2001.

District 84 
Incumbent Republican Rena Turner has represented the 84th District since 2013.

District 85 
Incumbent Republican Josh Dobson has represented the 85th District since 2013.

District 86 
Incumbent Republican Hugh Blackwell has represented the 86th District since 2009.

District 87 
Incumbent Republican Edgar Starnes has represented the 87th District and its predecessors since 1997.

District 88 
Incumbent Republican Rob Bryan has represented the 88th District since 2013.

District 89 
Incumbent Republican Mitchell Setzer has represented the 89th District and its predecessors since 1999.

District 90 
Incumbent Republican Sarah Stevens  has represented the 90th District since 2009.

District 91 
Incumbent Republican Bryan Holloway has represented the 91st District since 2005.

District 92 
Incumbent Republican Charles Jeter has represented the 92nd District since 2013.

District 93 
Incumbent Republican Jonathan Jordan has represented the 93rd District since 2011.

District 94 
Incumbent Republican Jeffrey Elmore has represented the 94th District since 2013.

District 95 
Incumbent Republican Robert Brawley has represented the 95th District since 2013. Brawley lost re-nomination to fellow Republican John Fraley.

District 96 
Incumbent Republican Andy Wells has represented the 96th District since 2013. Wells ran for the N.C Senate. Republican Jay Adams won the open seat.

District 97 
Incumbent Republican Jason Saine has represented the 97th District since 2011.

District 98 
Incumbent Republican Speaker of the House Thom Tillis has represented the 98th District since 2007. Tillis ran for the U.S Senate. Republican John Bradford won the open seat.

District 99 
Incumbent DemocratRodney Moore has represented the 99th District since 2011.

Districts 100-120

District 100 
Incumbent Democrat Tricia Cotham has represented the 100th District since 2007.

District 101 
Incumbent Democrat Beverly Earle has represented the 101st District and its predecessors since 1995.

District 102 
Incumbent Democrat Becky Carney has represented the 102nd District since 2003.

District 103 
Incumbent Republican Bill Brawley has represented the 103rd District since 2011.

District 104 
Incumbent Republican Ruth Samuelson has represented the 104th District since 2007. Samuelson didn't seek re-election and Republican Dan Bishop won the open seat.

District 105 
Incumbent Republican Jacqueline Schaffer has represented the 105th District since 2013.

District 106 
Incumbent Democrat Carla Cunningham has represented the 106th District since 2013.

District 107 
Incumbent Democrat Kelly Alexander has represented the 107th District since 2009.

District 108 
Incumbent Republican John Torbett has represented the 108th District since 2011.

District 109 
Incumbent Republican Dana Bumgardner has represented the 109th District since 2013.

District 110 
Incumbent Republican Kelly Hastings has represented the 110th District since 2011.

District 111 
Incumbent Republican Tim Moore has represented the 111th District since 2003.

District 112 
Incumbent Republican Mike Hager has represented the 112th District since 2011.

District 113 
Incumbent Republican Chris Whitmire has represented the 113th District since 2013.

District 114 
Incumbent Democrat Susan Fisher has represented the 114th District since 2004.

District 115 
Incumbent Republican Nathan Ramsey has represented the 115th District since 2013.

District 116 
Incumbent Republican Tim Moffitt has represented the 116th District since 2011. Moffitt lost re-election to Democrat Brian Turner.

District 117 
Incumbent Republican Chuck McGrady has represented the 117th District since 2011.

District 118 
Incumbent Republican Michele Presnell has represented the 118th District since 2013.

District 119 
Incumbent Democrat Joe Sam Queen has represented the 119th District since 2013.

District 120 
Incumbent Republican Roger West has represented the 120th District and its predecessors since 2000.

References

North Carolina House of Representatives
House of Representatives
2014